Fair Forest Hotel is a historic hotel building located in Union, South Carolina.  It was built in 1924–1926, and is a five-story, steel and concrete building faced with brick and limestone in the Neo-Classical style. The building consists of a one-story base, three-story shaft section, and one-story capital with a Corinthian order cornice.

It was added to the National Register of Historic Places in 1984. It is located in the Union Downtown Historic District.

References

Hotel buildings on the National Register of Historic Places in South Carolina
Neoclassical architecture in South Carolina
Hotel buildings completed in 1926
Buildings and structures in Union County, South Carolina
National Register of Historic Places in Union County, South Carolina
Historic district contributing properties in South Carolina